The Business of Drugs is a 2020 American crime documentary streaming television miniseries.

Host 
 Amaryllis Fox

Episodes

Release 
The Business of Drugs was released on July 14, 2020 on Netflix.

References

External links 
 
 

2020 American television series debuts
2020 American television series endings
2020s American documentary television series
2020s American television miniseries
English-language Netflix original programming
Netflix original documentary television series
Works about Mexican drug cartels
Works about Colombian drug cartels